Edgar Morais is an actor and filmmaker. He studied theater in Lisbon, Portugal and was a student of Ivana Chubbuck in LA and Susan Batson in NYC and has worked with globally celebrated filmmakers such as Larry Clark, Victoria Mahoney, Teresa Sutherland, Tiago Guedes and Rodrigo Areias.

Personal life 
Morais was born in Portugal, to an antique restorer mother and a contractor father. He was raised in Lisbon and graduated from EPTC, one of Portugal's oldest and most prestigious acting schools. Edgar studied acting with Ivana Chubbuck at her studio in Los Angeles and with Susan Batson in NYC. 

Edgar Morais divides his time between the USA and Portugal.

Acting career
Morais made his stage debut in William Shakespeare's Macbeth at the Mirita Casimiro Theater in Lisbon in 2006. He appeared in many theater productions including Moliere's A Rehearsal at Versailles, Brian Friel's Lovers, Jean Genet's Deathwatch, Arnold Wesker's The Kitchen and in the Portuguese Golden Globe winning adaptation of William Shakespeare's The Tragedy of Julius Caesar, directed by Luís Miguel Cintra, at the São Luiz Municipal Theater in Lisbon.

In 2007, while still in theater school, Morais made his acting film debut in From Now On (winner of the Audience Award at Rio de Janeiro International Film Festival), directed by Locarno Film Festival's alumna Catarina Ruivo.

While in Los Angeles, Edgar was cast in the NBC TV show CTRL, directed by Robert Kirbyson, in Q'orianka Kilcher's (Terrence Malick's The New World) directional debut short-film, Saudade, in Chasing Eagle Rock directed by Erick Avari, alongside Beth Behrs and Michael Welch, in The Monogamy Experiment directed by Amy Rider alongside Shailene Woodley and Renee Olstead and in Oh Gallow Lay directed by Julian Wayser which premiered at the Venice Film Festival in 2015 in the Horizons section. 

Morais can also be seen in Rome Film Festival's Best Picture Winner Marfa Girl'''s 2018 sequel Marfa Girl 2, directed by Larry Clark, and in the forthcoming Chalk directed by Victoria Mahoney alongside Shiloh Fernandez and Mirrah Folks.

In 2019, Edgar was as one of only 10 actors selected to take part in "Passaporte", an initiative created by the Portuguese Academy of Cinema (Academia Portuguesa de Cinema) to present and promote Portuguese cinema talents to some of the most influential casting directors in the world.

Edgar Morais can be next seen in the upcoming films A Cup of Coffee and New Shoes On directed by Gentian Koçi (Tallinn Black Nights Film Festival, Gothenburg Film Festival), Restos (Remains of the Wind) directed by Tiago Guedes (Cannes Film Festival), Lovely, Dark and Deep directed by Teresa Sutherland and The Worst Man In London directed by Rodrigo Areias.

Directing careerHeatstroke starring Leah Pipes, Michael Welch and Paul James Jordan marks Morais' narrative directorial debut. The short film had its world premiere in the official selection at IndieLisboa International Film Festival on May 4th 2019, where it competed for the Short Film Grand Prize. Heatstroke went on to screen in competition at Tallinn Black Nights Film Festival, Maryland Film Festival, Beverly Hills Film Festival, FEST New Directors New Films Festival and Method Fest Independent Film Festival among others. The film won a CinEuphoria Award for "Best Screenplay" and "Top Short Film of the Year" and was subsequently broadcast nationally on RTP.

On June 25th 2021, We Won't Forget, the short film directed by Edgar Morais and Lucas Elliot Eberl, had its world premiere in competition at Palm Springs International ShortFest. The film was co-written by the directors and Whitney Able, who stars in the film as a woman whose frustrations boil to the surface while hosting a party for her friends, culminating in a public freakout that turns into collective hysteria. Edgar Morais also stars in the film alongside John Patrick Amedori, Paul James, Davida Williams and Caitlyn Folley, among others.  The film screened in competition at the Hamptons International Film Festival, Tirana International Film Festival, Woodstock Film Festival, Rooftop Films and IndieLisboa International Film Festival, among others. We Won't Forget won the Grand Jury Prize, as well as the award for Best Editing at Castrovillari Film Festival and the jury's Honorable Mention at FEST New Directors New Films Festival. We Won't Forget was nominated for Best Short Film at the 2022 Sophia Awards (Portuguese Academy Award).

Edgar is currently in production on his feature film directorial debut, You Above All'', which he also wrote and stars in, co-directing with Lucas Elliot Eberl, with a cast that includes Olivia Thirlby, Steven Weber, Anabela Moreira, Richard Riehle, Rita Blanco and John Robinson. 
The USA/Portugal co-production is expected to be released in 2024.

Filmography

References

External links

1989 births
Living people
Portuguese male film actors
Portuguese male television actors
Portuguese male stage actors
People from Coimbra